Jeremy Koh (born 19 June 1989) is a Singaporean operatic tenor, adjunct voice lecturer at the Nanyang Academy of Fine Arts (NAFA), United World College South East Asia (East) and artistic director of the Spot Pocket Opera Theatre. He is also one of the only two successful auditionees to join the Singapore Lyric Opera as a Leow Siak Fah Young Artist in 2016.

Early life 
Koh has a Bachelor of Music degree from the Royal College of Music (London) after receiving his music diploma from NAFA. He has studied with tenors Shieh Yih Lim, Justin Lavender, Nicholas Sears; Soprano Jessica Chen, and baritone Stephen Roberts.

Teaching and performance career 
Koh is the first Singaporean to win the Tan Ngiang Kaw/Tan Ngiang Ann Memorial Vocal Competition. He was also awarded the certificate of special mention and bronze award at the 5th Bangkok Opera Foundation International Singing Competition (2013).

Koh's operatic endeavors include Raoul de St. Brioche (The Merry Widow), Bastien (Bastien und Bastienne), Gingerbread Witch (Hansel and Gretel), Kornélis (La Princesse Jaune), Scholar Luo (Liu San Jie), Frantz (Le 66), Alfred (Die Fledermaus), Zacharia (The Blind Beggars)  and He from the world premiere of Nicole Murphy's The Kamikaze Mind. As a concert soloist, he has sung in Beethoven’s Symphony No.9, Mozart's Requiem Mass in D minor, Bach's Magnificat in D Major, and the world premiere of Goh Toh Chai's Song of the Rising Wind.

Koh has enjoyed collaborations with maestro Tsung Yeh, Lim Yau, Ashley Solomon, Volker Hartung, Somtow Sucharitkul, Joshua Kangming Tan, and Robert Casteels, with organisations such as the Singapore Lyric Opera, Siam Philharmonic Orchestra, Singapore Chinese Orchestra, Spot Pocket Opera Theatre, New Opera Singapore, NAFA Symphony Orchestra, Ding Yi Music Company, Flamenco Sin Fronteras and chamber•sounds.

Whilst developing as a performer, Koh believes in giving back through education and outreach efforts. He is currently an adjunct lecturer at the School of Music, Nanyang Academy of Fine Arts, and also teaches at the National Silver Academy, United World College Southeast Asia (East Campus) and Intune Music School.

Working closely with the Spot Pocket Opera Theatre, Koh has brought innovative programmes to audiences at unconventional spaces in Singapore and Malaysia.

References 

1989 births
Living people
21st-century Singaporean male singers